The technical regulator of communications in Chile is the Ministry of Transportation and Telecommunications, through the Undersecretariat of Telecommunications (Subtel).

Telephone

History 
Telephone and telegraph services started in Chile in 1879, three years after Alexander Graham Bell, presented his patent for a telephonic system. José Dottin Husbands, an associate of Thomas Edison, arrived into the port of Valparaíso carrying the first set of switching equipment and telephones. By 1880 the first telephone company of the country is born (Compañía Chilena de Teléfonos de Edison), while in 1893, after a rapid expansion in the northern regions of Chile, telephone services started operating in the south,  thanks to the founding of Telefonica del Sur (current day Grupo GTD), a company created by a group of German immigrants that had previously settled in the area of Valdivia, Región de los Ríos.

Main lines in use: 2,567,938 (2020 est.)
Mobile cellular: 25,068,249 (2020 est.)
Pre-paid: 17,283,257
Post-paid: 6,847,497 
System: privatization began in 1988; advanced telecommunications infrastructure; modern system based on extensive microwave radio relay facilities; fixed-line connections have dropped in recent years as mobile-cellular usage continues to increase, reaching a level of 85 telephones per 100 persons
Domestic: extensive microwave radio relay links; domestic satellite system with 3 earth stations
international: country code - 56; submarine cables provide links to the US and to Central and South America; satellite earth stations - 2 Intelsat (Atlantic Ocean) (2007)

Radio
Broadcast stations: 1,490 (175 AM; 1,315 FM) (2006)

Television

Broadcast stations: 63 (plus 121 repeaters) (1997)
Broadcast television system: NTSC
Pay television: 4,158,874 (2012)

Internet

Internet hosts: 847,215 (2008)
Internet users: 16,822,264 (2020 est.)
Internet mobile users: 4,921,587
Internet country code: .cl

Other technical details
Electricity: 220 volts AC, 50 Hz

References

 
 
Chile